In enzymology, a 3-hydroxy-2-methylquinolin-4-one 2,4-dioxygenase is an enzyme that catalyzes the chemical reaction

3-hydroxy-2-methyl-1H-quinolin-4-one + O2  N-acetylanthranilate + CO

Thus, the two substrates of this enzyme are 3-hydroxy-2-methyl-1H-quinolin-4-one and O2, whereas its two products are N-acetylanthranilate and CO.

This enzyme belongs to the family of oxidoreductases, specifically those acting on single donors with O2 as oxidant and incorporation of two atoms of oxygen into the substrate (oxygenases). The oxygen incorporated need not be derived from O2.  The systematic name of this enzyme class is 3-hydroxy-2-methyl-1H-quinolin-4-one 2,4-dioxygenase (CO-forming). This enzyme is also called (1H)-3-hydroxy-4-oxoquinaldine 2,4-dioxygenase.

References

 
 
 

EC 1.13.11
Enzymes of unknown structure